Live at Nassau Coliseum '78 is a double live album by British progressive rock band Emerson, Lake & Palmer, released in 2011.

The live concert recording was recorded at the Nassau Veterans Memorial Coliseum in Uniondale, New York on February 9, 1978, and was remastered from original analog tapes for this release.  Prior to this release, only bootleg recordings of this concert were available.

Track listing
Disc 1

"Hoedown"		
"Tarkus"
"Eruption"
"Stones of Years"
"Iconoclast"
"Mass"
"Aquatarkus"
"Take a Pebble"
"Piano Concerto, No. 1 - First Movement: Allegro Giojoso"	
"Maple Leaf Rag"
"Take a Pebble (Reprise)"
"C'est La Vie"		
"Lucky Man"
"Pictures at an Exhibition"

Disc 2
"Tiger in a Spotlight"
"Watching Over You"
"Tank"
"Drum Solo"
"The Enemy God Dances with the Black Spirits"
"Nut Rocker"
"Pirates"
"Fanfare for the Common Man"

Personnel

Band members 
Keith Emerson - keyboards
Greg Lake - bass, guitars, vocals
Carl Palmer - percussion, drums

Production 
Producer (Archival Material Production), Supervised By – David Skye
Remastered by Randy Wine at MoonWine Studios
Tape Transfer: Rodney Pearson
Photos: Ken Jackson - ClassicRockConcertPhotos.com
Art Direction & Package Design: Lisa Glines

References

https://www.discogs.com/Emerson-Lake-Palmer-Live-At-Nassau-Coliseum-78/release/5387537

External links
http://www.amazon.com/Live-at-Nassau-Coliseum-78/dp/B004I1WIQG/ref=pd_bxgy_m_img_c

Emerson, Lake & Palmer live albums
2011 live albums